August Johannes Schram (born December 22, 1979) is a Swiss tenor, born in Lucerne.

Career
August Schram grew up in Küssnacht am Rigi and Zurich, where he later became a soloist in the Zurich Boys’ Choir. Since 2002 he attended the Rostock University of Music and Theatre. His first engagement was in 2007 for the world premiere of Pamina lebt by Lothar Hensel with the Mittelsächsische Theater in Freiberg/Sachsen, followed by his first fixed engagements at the Stadttheater Gießen. In the following years he performed oratorio concerts in the German speaking world, along with engagements at the Tyrol Festival in Erl, at the Neuköllner Opera Berlin and at the Hamburger Alleetheater. In 2013 "MeTube: August sings Carmen 'Habanera'" won the Berlin Music Video Awards.

Film
2009 Producer, singer and actor:  short movie Der Doppelgänger, based on the song of the same name by Heinrich Heine and Franz Schubert (directed by Stephanie Winter). Busan International Short Film Festival. 
2011 Associate producer: documentary Login 2 Life by Daniel Moshel. Preis des Kleinen Fernsehspiels by the ZDF. 
2012: singer, actor and producer: music video MeTube, directed by Daniel Moshel, an interpretation of Habanera by Georges Bizet's Carmen. Deutscher Web Video Preis in the category ‘Epic’

References

External links

Swiss tenors
Living people
1979 births
21st-century Swiss male singers